Bonia is a genus of bamboo.

Bonia may also refer to:

 Bonia (fashion), a Malaysian high-end fashion retailer
 Thomas Bonia (1856–1926), a mariner and politician in Newfoundland

See also 
 Bonya River, a river in the American territory of Guam